Two Tribes B.V. is an independent video game developer based in Harderwijk, Netherlands. Founded in 2001 by Martijn Reuvers and Collin van Ginkel, it develops its own intellectual property and games for franchises. As announced on 10 March 2016, the office closed in September 2016, after the release of Rive. However, Two Tribes continues development of the Nintendo Switch version of Rive, as well as supporting older games.

History
Two Tribes originally specialized in portable games and later developed games for consoles due to the popularity of the Wii and Xbox 360. Two Tribes has focused on developing games for Windows and Macintosh, including online distribution. The company started by porting its franchises, Toki Tori and RUSH, to Windows and Mac OS through Steam and the Mac App Store. The company has started to work with other developers to port their games to other platforms, such as Swords & Soldiers, by Ronimo Games to iOS and Edge by Mobigame to Windows and Macintosh. Two Tribes has worked with major video game companies including Capcom, Nokia, Team17, and THQ.

In January 2014, Two Tribes B.V. filed for bankruptcy, mainly due to disappointing sales of Toki Tori 2. However, Two Tribes Publishing B.V., which owns and publishes all Two Tribes B.V. games and handles all contracts, remained unaffected. A new daughter company was formed to handle the development of future titles. One working title was RE:Wind, later announced as Rive.

Games

 Toki Tori
 2001, Game Boy Color; published by Capcom
 2003, mobile phone; published by Aim Productions
 2008, WiiWare
 2009, iOS
 2010, Windows/Macintosh/Linux
 2011, PlayStation 3/Android
 2013, Wii U
 2015, Nintendo 3DS next to the earlier Game Boy Color version on Virtual Console, a new 3D remake was released in November 2015; both published by Two Tribes
 2018, Switch
 Three Tribes (cancelled, Game Boy Advance)
 Bonk's Return (2006, mobile phone; published by Hudson Entertainment)
 Monkeyball Minigolf (2006, mobile phone; published by Sega Mobile)
 Garfield: A Tail of Two Kitties (2006, Nintendo DS; published by The Game Factory)
 Golf Pro Contest 2 (2007, mobile phone; published by Blaze)
 SpongeBob SquarePants: Creature from the Krusty Krab (2007, mobile phone; published by THQ Wireless)
 Worms: Open Warfare 2 (2007, Nintendo DS; published by THQ)
 Rubik's Puzzle World (2008, Wii/Nintendo DS; published by The Game Factory)
 Rubik's Puzzle Galaxy: RUSH (2009, WiiWare)
 Frenzic (2010, DSiWare)
 Ice Age: Dawn of the Dinosaurs (2010, iOS)
 RUSH (2010, Windows; 2011, Macintosh/Linux; 2013, Wii U)
 Swap This! (2011, iOS; 2018 Switch)
 Swords & Soldiers (2011, iOS; 2014, Wii U)
 Edge (2011, Windows/Macintosh/Linux/Android; 2013, Wii U/Nintendo 3DS)
 Toki Tori 2 (2013, Windows/Macintosh/Linux/Wii U; 2016, PlayStation 4; 2018, Switch)
 Rive (2016, Windows/Macintosh/Linux/PlayStation 4; 2017, Switch)

References

External links

Video game development companies
Video game companies of the Netherlands
Video game companies established in 2001
Companies based in Gelderland
Dutch companies established in 2001
Harderwijk
Privately held companies of the Netherlands